Interventricular artery may refer to:

 Anterior interventricular branch of left coronary artery
 Posterior interventricular artery